La Devise is a commune in the department of Charente-Maritime, southwestern France. The municipality was established on 1 January 2018 by merger of the former communes of Vandré (the seat), Chervettes and Saint-Laurent-de-la-Barrière.

See also 
 Communes of the Charente-Maritime department

References

External links
 

Devise
Populated places established in 2018
2018 establishments in France